Sipke Zijlstra (born 13 April 1985) is a track cyclist from Netherlands. He participated in the team pursuit at the 2009 and 2010 UCI Track Cycling World Championships. In the under-23 category he won the bronze medal in the team pursuit at the 2007 UEC European Track Championships. In 2010 he won the bronze medal in the team pursuit at the 2010 UEC European Track Championships, together with Levi Heimans, Arno van der Zwet and Tim Veldt in Pruszków, Poland.

References 

1985 births
Living people
Dutch male cyclists
People from Tytsjerksteradiel
Dutch track cyclists
Cyclists from Friesland
20th-century Dutch people
21st-century Dutch people